Bangkok Girl is a documentary film that was both produced and directed by Jordan Clark. It is a low-budget film, having cost $10,000 to produce, and takes sex tourism in Bangkok as its subject. Bangkok Girl is 43 minutes long and focuses on Pla (full name: Sirirat Rapsithorn), a bargirl who is 19 years old and who guides Clark through the city. The film explores Pla's background and how she came to be where she is. Pla began working as a bargirl at the age of 13, and, while she had managed to avoid being forced into prostitution up until the point that the documentary was filmed, the film suggests that she will eventually be forcibly prostituted. In November 2005, the film aired on "The Lens", a program on Canada's CBC Television. Sweden's Sveriges Television also aired the film.

References

External links
 
 

2005 films
Canadian biographical films
Documentary films about women
2005 documentary films
Documentary films about prostitution in Thailand
Canadian documentary television films
Films set in Bangkok
Films shot in Bangkok
Documentary films about child abuse
Human rights abuses in Thailand
Sex industry in Thailand
Films about child prostitution
Forced prostitution
Films about human trafficking
Human trafficking in Thailand
Sex tourism
2005 directorial debut films
2000s English-language films
2000s Canadian films